Light tower may refer to:

 a lighthouse
 Light tower (equipment)
 Stack light, signal lights that show the state of machines
 Moonlight tower, big lighting structures popular in the late 19th century
 High-mast lighting
 Seoul Lite, also known as Light Tower
 Huaisheng Mosque, also known as the Lighthouse Mosque